Stephen T. Badin High School, (commonly known as Badin High School) is a Catholic high school of the Archdiocese of Cincinnati school system, serving grades nine through twelve in Hamilton, Ohio, United States. It is a comprehensive high school which admits students of all levels of ability. The curriculum is offered on four distinct levels. The student-to-teacher ratio is 13.7:1

History
Badin High School is named after Father Stephen T. Badin, the first Catholic priest ordained in the United States. Badin High School first opened its doors the fall of 1966. Previously, two high schools served the area from the early 1900s until their closings in 1966: Hamilton Catholic High School for young men and Notre Dame High School for young women. The Sisters of Notre Dame de Namur, the Brothers of St. Mary, archdiocesan priests, other religious orders and committed lay persons laid the foundation of Badin High school at its current location near Potter's golf course on New London Road. Father Frank Miller (Purcell '42) organized the merger and became the first principal of the combined school.

Notable alumni
 Malia Berkely, professional soccer player currently with the North Carolina Courage
 Jim Holstein, former NBA Champion, college basketball coach
 Kevin McGuff girls basketball coach, The Ohio State University
 Kent Tekulve, major league ballplayer and scout
 Jim Tracy, major league ballplayer and manager

Clubs and activities
The school offers a variety of clubs and activities for students to enjoy. A few on the list are: Student Council, Academic Team, Badin Book Club, Badin Theater, Civics Club, Cross Country, Envirothon, History Club, InterAlliance Chapter, Liturgical Music Group, Badin Studio (art club), Badin Rocks (band), Jazz Band, Claybusters (Clay target shooting), Archery, Fishing Club, foreign language clubs, service clubs, Ski Club, Spirit Club and more.

Athletics
The teams from Badin are known as the Rams. Student athletes compete in the GCL Co-Ed Division through the Archdiocese of Cincinnati.

Ohio High School Athletic Association State Championships
The Rams have won a total of 8 combined Ohio state titles in boys and girls sports in divisions 2 and 3, and have won 4 individual state titles.

Ohio High School Athletic Association Division II State Championships:

 Girls Basketball   – 1998
 Girls Soccer  – 2005
 Baseball  – 1991, 1996 

Ohio High School Athletic Association Division III State Championships:

 Girls Soccer  – 2013, 2014
 Baseball  – 1991 
 Football  – 1990 
 Boys Basketball  – 1988

See also
St. Peter in Chains School

References

External links
Badin High School
Greater Catholic League, Coed

 

Roman Catholic Archdiocese of Cincinnati
Catholic secondary schools in Ohio
High schools in Butler County, Ohio
Educational institutions established in 1966
Buildings and structures in Hamilton, Ohio
1966 establishments in Ohio
Sisters of Notre Dame de Namur schools